Brewer Peak is a peak,  high, along the west wall of Pitkevitch Glacier near the glacier's head, in the Admiralty Mountains, a major mountain range of Victoria Land, Antarctica. The topographical feature was first mapped by the United States Geological Survey from surveys and from U.S. Navy air photos, 1960–63, and named by the Advisory Committee on Antarctic Names for Thomas J. Brewer, U.S. Navy, Commissaryman at McMurdo Station, Hut Point Peninsula, Ross Island, 1967. The peak lies on the Pennell Coast, a portion of Antarctica lying between Cape Williams and Cape Adare.

References
 

Mountains of Victoria Land
Pennell Coast